The Mitsuoka Le-Seyde was a limited production car manufactured in mid-1990, based on the Nissan Silvia S13. Only 500 units were made, and Mitsuoka claims that all were sold within four days after they went on sale.

The Le-Seyde resembles the Zimmer Golden Spirit. They were designed at Nissan's Kyushu plant, where the design for the interior was based on the Silvia S13. The engine used is the same naturally aspirated 2.0 L SR20DE used in the Nissan Silvia.

Dore

Pronounced "DURA", it is a convertible version of the Le-Seyde, produced in July 1991 as a limited production model and was based on the 1979-1993 Ford Mustang Fox body.

The centre portion and interior was similar to the Fox body Mustang. It used the Mustang's  Windsor V8 engine and was manufactured in left hand drive configuration, as opposed to right hand drive in many cars in Japan.

New Le-Seyde

A redesigned version of Le-Seyde (also known as the New Le-Seyde) was introduced in late 2000, and was based on the Nissan Silvia S15. it is identical to the original Le-Seyde with only a few minor cosmetic changes, mostly in regards to the centre portion and interior, which are similar to the Silvia S15.

The engine used was the naturally aspirated 2.0 L SR20DE, the same engine featured in the Silvia S15, and was similar to the previous iteration of the SR20DE found in the Silvia S13 as well as the previous Le-Seyde.

References

Mitsuoka vehicles
Retro-style automobiles
Cars introduced in 1990
Cars discontinued in 2006